, also known as Hip Whip Girl, is a Japanese sports manga series written and illustrated by Daichi Sorayomi. It follows a gymnast becoming the richest player in the fictional women-only sport, where players can use only breasts and buttocks to defeat opponents or send them into the water. It was serialized in Shogakukan's shōnen manga magazine Weekly Shōnen Sunday from July 2013 to April 2017, with the chapters collected for eighteen tankōbon volumes. An anime television series adaptation produced by Xebec aired from October to December 2016.

Premise
The series is set in an alternate reality, where the women-only gambling sport becomes a fad in Japan. Its matches are held atop floating platforms, known as "Land" in the swimming pool stadium. The players fight to defeat their opponents and send them into the water, by using breasts or buttocks. Olympic athlete Nozomi Kaminashi wishes to win the high earnings. She learns the way to fame and fortune in sports with more challenges than she imagined.

Characters
 

A cheerful and energetic girl wishing to become the richest keijo player. When she was an athlete, she moves around the Land. Her fighting type is Infighter. Her signature attack is the Vacuum Butt Cannon, which sends anyone or anything far. She is sometimes a troublemaker. Although she gets stuck in tough cases like wearing the UTM and pulling out turnips with her butt. She has a strong hunch when using her head in her butt, and figures out whose special talent is. Despite her loss, she redeems herself by learning all she can at school. She has a long dark blue hair tied with a white ribbon in the back and dark blue eyes.

Nozomi's best friend and former judo champion. She is considered among the most promising new recruits and being the fastest player. Her fighting type is Outfighter. Even though she is not fazed by her classmate's antics, except Nozomi, she has a caring friend to her roommates and helps her friends solve the problem. She has short white hair with a blue ribbon in the back and dark blue eyes. Her father disapproves her moving on from judo, but he accepts it when the audiences encourage Sayaka to adapt her move.
 

A resident of Hiroshima. She is quietly soft-spoken, due to being self-conscious about her dialect until she finally speaks out in the final hip toss endurance test. Her ponytail moves in reaction, when she is addressed or feeling emotional. Her right hand is very sensitive and can copy her opponents' abilities by feeling up their butts, an ability she calls Scanning Hand. In addition, she is a great strategist and used special abilities from her friends as the situation demands in the East West War. She reads the magazine. Her fighting style is Counter. She has a brown ponytail and eyes, and wears a scarf.
 

A countryside village girl wishing to gain popularity. She can revitalize her village by lacking the population. She has the softest buttocks and breast which can absorb attacks and reflect it back. She is clumsy, but she is be absent-minded and goes into any comical situations. Not to mention she has an unusual accent along with Kazane which is why Nozomi misunderstands her.

An Elite Class Rank 3. She is considered a sports prodigy ever since she was a child and because of this, she makes friends after joining keijo. She has a happy go lucky attitude when playing on the Land. Her attack strategy is to strike her opponent's jaw which causes a shock to their brain that knocks them out. A cross-like sparkle appears on her eyes whenever she participates. Her attack style is Infighter. She has short light purple hair and eyes.

An Elite Class Rank 1 and a lesbian player. She is a playful girl with a great interest in Nozomi. Her technique, Breast Hypnosis, moves like a pendulum to immobilize her opponents. It was later banned from school. Her fighting style is Infighter. She has long blonde hair and light blue eyes.

An Elite Class Rank 2. She initially claims the title in Western Japan which sparks a rivalry between her and Sayaka. A former swimmer, she has a greater lung capacity to hold her breath and move at high speed longer. Her favorite technique is the Butt Gattling. Whenever she participates in keijo, her hair stands up in a form of cat ears. In addition to small frame and cat hairstyle expression, her nickname is "Rinrin". Her fighting style is Outfighter. She has blue short hair and blue eyes.

The main teacher in the West. She gives out tasks for the girls that are related to keijo. Like hip toss with the beach ball and giving morning exercise. She has amazing speed as a test in the second episode knocking four students off the land. She has long blue hair and blue eyes.

One of the first keijo players and prize queens known as the Alluring Siren in the past. In the present day, she is Nozomi‘a teacher. She was the first to recognize her Vacuum Butt Cannon move and knows the danger of the attack as she once used it herself. She owns the UTMs which she gives to Nozomi before giving to her elite class in preparation for the East West War. She has a rivalry with the keijo training school's head teacher in East. She has orange hair and eyes and has a high weight compared to the one she had when she was a teenager.

One of the other teachers in the West. Although she looks blind, she is a good teacher. She has long blonde hair and an unknown eye color.

An Elite Class Rank 4. She comes from a family of players and is naturally gifted for sports. However, she sees it as nothing more than work, until participating in keijo for the first time. She attacks, while her back is turned and uses the vibrations on the Land to detect and predict their movements without looking. Her buttocks release an aura in the form of a dog and her buttocks appear to home in on her target as though she were moving on auto-pilot. When not participating, she hears homosexual stories on a headset and imagines about it which, to her opponents, makes it appear uninterested. Her fighting style is Infighter. She has short blue hair and blue eyes.

Media

Manga
Keijo!!!!!!!!, written and illustrated by Daichi Sorayomi, was serialized in Shogakukan's magazine Weekly Shōnen Sunday from July 24, 2013, to April 26, 2017. Shogakukan collected the chapters in eighteen tankōbon volumes, released from November 18, 2013 to July 18, 2017.

Volume list

Anime
An anime television series adaptation was announced in February 2016. The video game Dead or Alive Xtreme 3 has a crossover promotion with Keijo!!!!!!!!, with in-game swimsuits based on the series. The anime was produced by Xebec. It was directed by Hideya Takahashi, written by Takao Kato, composed by Hayato Matsuo and the characters designed by Keiya Nakano. It aired from October 6 to December 22, 2016. The opening theme from episodes 1 to 11) "Dream X Scramble!" was performed by AiRI, while the ending theme "Fantas/Hip Girlfriends!" was performed by the show's original cast. The series was released across six Blu-ray and DVD home video release volumes, and each volume includes an original video animation. 

The anime was streamed by Crunchyroll and Funimation, the latter of which streamed an English dub. Following Sony's acquisition of Crunchyroll, the English dub was moved to Crunchyroll. Medialink licensed the series in South and Southeast Asia.

Episode list

Specials

Reception
In November 2016, Crunchyroll revealed their most viewed anime shows of the season in the United States per state; the Keijo!!!!!!!! anime was the most popular in nine states, with only Yuri on Ice and Drifters being most viewed in more states. In 2017, fans in Portugal were in the planning stages for a defictionalized Keijo sport league. The rules of the defictionalized version were modified and protective gear for the breasts, rear, and thighs were added to make the sport "safer and more realistic". A proof of concept video showed a match in action and the league planned to scout for interested parties and venues for play.

Explanatory notes

References

External links
 Keijo!!!!!!!! official manga website at Web Sunday 
  
 

2013 manga
Anime series based on manga
Bandai Namco franchises
Comedy anime and manga
Crunchyroll anime
Ecchi anime and manga
Fictional martial sports in anime and manga
IG Port franchises
Manga adapted into television series
Medialink
School life in anime and manga
Shogakukan franchises
Shogakukan manga
Shōnen manga
Tokyo MX original programming
Xebec (studio)